Mortification is an Australian Christian extreme metal band which was formed in 1987 as a heavy metal group, Lightforce, by mainstay Steve Rowe on bass guitar and vocals. By 1990, in the Melbourne suburb of Moorabbin, they were renamed as Mortification with the line-up of Rowe, Michael Carlisle on guitar, and Jayson Sherlock on drums. Mortification has released fourteen studio albums, three compilation albums, three extended plays, six live discs, one demo album, one box set, and several videos on major record labels such as Nuclear Blast. As one of the earliest internationally successful Christian death metal bands from Australia, they served as an inspiration for later similar groups.

During the early 1990s Mortification played death metal, thrash, and grindcore, and "belonged to the elite of the death metal movement," especially with their 1992 album Scrolls of the Megilloth. After the departure of Sherlock, Mortification began experimenting with groove metal, hardcore punk, and power metal. They achieved commercial success with Blood World in 1994 and received critical acclaim for 1996's EnVision EvAngelene. Despite the lack of subsequent commercial success or mainstream critical recognition, "the band, in spite of their extreme sound, are some kind of superstars in the 'White Metal' scene", and have been described as "a legend in the death metal scene."

In late 1996, Rowe was diagnosed with acute lymphatic leukaemia and took 18 months to recover. Mortification issued their tenth album, Triumph of Mercy in August 1998 and accompanied it with a tour of North America. By August 1999, the band had sold a total of a quarter of a million albums across Europe and the US. They returned to their death/thrash roots for the 2004 album, Brain Cleaner.

History

Original line-up 
In 1987, bass guitarist and vocalist Steve Rowe formed the Australian power metal band LightForce with Murray Adams on guitar, Steve Johnson on vocals and Errol Willenberg on drums. The group played on the local metal scene and signed with United States label, Pure Metal Records to release their debut album, Mystical Thieves in May 1989. They supported US Christian glam metallers Stryper on their 1989 tour of Australia. In 1990, Rowe, was determined to play heavy music with a Christian message, and was joined by drummer Jayson Sherlock and guitarist Cameron Hall under the LightForce name to record the demo Break the Curse. The group had changed musically towards thrash metal with a death metal influence and when Michael Carlisle replaced Hall on guitar, they were renamed Mortification. According to Rowe, the name comes from the King James Bible, "Mortify therefore the deeds of the flesh." Break the Curse was released in 1991 as Mortification's second album.

In early 1991, they released their self-titled debut album on the US Christian label Intense Records. The direction of the music had changed once again. A lot of the songs were taken from their demo Break the Curse, but the band tuned their guitars down, and the feel to the songs was a lot more heavy and doomy than on previous material. Also, Rowe proved to be an excellent death metal vocalist, presenting his "Grind Baritone vocals of extreme reality" throughout the album. According to AllMusic, the band "sought to provide a positive alternative to traditional death metal acts such as Carcass, Death, and Obituary. On the strength of their self-titled 1990 debut, Mortification quickly gained a reputation in their native Australia for being one of the loudest and fastest bands around."

In 1992, the band signed a deal with Nuclear Blast Records in Germany, which had many European death metal groups on their roster. Mortification released their third album, Scrolls of the Megilloth, which had great success and, in the Christian metal scene, is considered a classic as well as a piece of Australian metal history. The line-up had outdone themselves, playing some fast death metal with a few doom metal influences on a couple of tracks. According to AllMusic, the album contains "some of the most frightening vocals ever recorded." A video-compilation titled Grind Planets which featured eight Mortification music-videos shot by film maker Neil Johnson was also released. Grind Planets, the title is a word play of the term 'Rock Star'. It presented a more humorous side of Mortification with the "On the Road" material in contrast with their serious message about spiritual warfare – a common theme among Christian extreme metal bands during the early 1990s when anti-Christian bands such as Deicide and Morbid Angel gained popularity.

The band conquered new ground with their 1993 release Post Momentary Affliction. Most notably, the vocal style shifted, adding some thrash-like screams to the already-familiar metal growls. The band also experimented with the industrial style. The album also featured one of Mortification's most popular songs, "Grind Planetarium". Jayson Sherlock had his last concert with the band at the Black Stump Festival '93, and the concert was released both on CD and also VHS under the name Live Planetarium. A big US major magazine cited the Live Planetarium video as the best live album and video they have ever seen and heard. Jayson joined Paramaecium, and Phil Gibson replaced him as Mortification's drummer.

Commercial success 
The band released a new album in 1994 called Blood World. They leaned more towards modern groove/thrash with  classic metal and hardcore punk influence rather than death metal, and Steve mainly used his shouts rather than growling. Phil and Michael left the band, and Steve stood by himself. The strange combination of extreme styles began setting Mortification apart from the crowd of same sounding bands and widened the band's audience as they became quickly recognised as innovators and not imitators. Blood World received rave reviews in America and Europe. Horror Infernal Magazine gave the album 13 out of 13 points. Blood World eventually became their best selling album.

1994 also saw the birth of Steve's own record label, "Rowe Productions". Also, Break the Curse was remixed and re-released by Nuclear Blast Records with a bonus track called "Butchered Mutilation".

Together with numerous friends, Steve recorded the album Primitive Rhythm Machine which was released in 1995. The sound of the album is really nasty and messy with a tribal-percussion to it. Musically, Steve mixed all the styles Mortification had played in the past, death metal, thrash metal and groove metal.

Also, Mortification's The Best of Five Years were released. A compilation album of older material. 2 songs from each previous release made a good introduction to new fans, and showed the bands innovation. This was the last album to be released by Mortification through Intense Records.

In 1996, Steve Rowe started his search for a new drummer and guitarist. The drum position was filled by longtime roadie Keith Bannister, who had become a Christian during the first Mortification tour back in 1990. He learned how to play the drums while Mortification was on tour, and when they came back, Steve saw that he had been practising, and was amazed at his progress, and instantly chose him to fill the spot as the drummer of the band. The guitar position was filled by guitarist Lincoln Bowen. Together, they recorded the album EnVision EvAngelene. This disc mixed elements of classic metal, thrash metal and added a punk feel to some of the songs. The first cut is an epic 18+ minute about Christ's crucifixion from the angels' point of view.

Two live EPs were also released, Noah Sat Down and Listened to the Mortification Live EP While Having a Coffee and Live without Fear. Unlike their first live album Live Planetarium from the Black Stump Music and Arts Festival, this was recorded at a small club, with a raw sound.

A video compilation called EnVidion was released, containing numerous music-videos and interviews. Also released this year was a novel by Steve Rowe titled "Minstrel".

In 2006, their song "Livin like a Zombie" was played in the background of the BME Pain Olympics: Final Round.

Rowe diagnosed with leukaemia 
In late 1996, Steve Rowe was diagnosed with acute lymphatic leukaemia, and after 18 months he was in remission despite a seemingly failed bone marrow transplant. Soon after, Mortification recorded their tenth album, Triumph of Mercy, and released it in August 1998. It was issued by Rowe Productions in the US and Nuclear Blast Germany in Europe. Lyrically, the album focused on the experiences of Rowe and the band during the previous two-years. The style of the album was a mixture of groove and thrash. They followed with a North American tour.

1999 saw the release of Hammer of God, also a mix of thrash and groove. The death metal elements had vanished, but the religious message of the lyrics remained. The band's line-up was Rowe, with Keith Bannister on drums and Lincoln Bowen on guitar. They undertook another European tour to promote Hammer of God. By August that year, the group had sold a total of a quarter of a million albums across Europe and the US.

In 2000, Mortification released another live album, recorded at Black Stump Festival in 1999, called 10 Years Live Not Dead, which mainly featured material from their newer albums plus a new song called "Dead Man Walking". Keith Bannister left the band, and a replacement was found in the very young drummer Adam Zaffarese.

The new line-up released the album The Silver Cord is Severed in 2000 and the band went on its first world tour. The music continued to be thrash and groove. While many fans thought the album was the weakest effort in the band's career, The Silver Cord is Severed sold well like its precessors. This was due to the fact that – like Nuclear Blast founder Markus Staiger stated in a newsletter – had become "some kind of superstars in the Christian metal scene". At the end of 2000 Lincoln Bowen left, and the band was split, which seemed like it was the end of Mortification.

A collection of Mortification songs was released in 2002 on the compilation-album Ten Years 1990–2000 Power, Pain, and Passion.

However, things changed when the guitarists Jeff Lewis (Sympathy) and Mick Jelinic (Terraphobia) joined the band, and in 2002 they released Relentless. The band went in a slightly more heavy direction with a good dose of thrash and classic metal. The band played live as a 4-piece only a couple of times, as Jeff Lewis left the band.

Return to death/thrash roots 
2004 saw the released of Brain Cleaner, now with ex-Cybergrind and current Martyrs Shrine drummer Mike Forsberg. This was the heaviest release from the band in ten years, and fast thrash dominates the album with many groove and death metal influences.

In 2006, Mortification released a new album. It was originally titled Impaling the Goblin, but after many complaints that in some cultures this term had a sexual connotation to it, they changed the name to Erasing the Goblin. The album, with a cover which features a warrior throwing a sword into a goblin sitting on a rocking chair in a cave, is said to be a take on their older death/thrash sound around the time of their first 2-3 albums.

In early 2008, the band's  nine early records were re-released by Polish Metal Mind Productions. In July 2008 Steve Rowe announced on his website that drummer Damien Percy was leaving after three years in the band and has been replaced by Dave Kilgallon, who is also the drummer for Australian Christian metal bands Grave Forsaken and Scourged Flesh.

On 6 June, it was announced that Mortification will record a new album in 2009. On 5 August, the band stated that they would record a demo for the new album. On 4 February, Rowe announced that the album titled The Evil Addiction Destroying Machine was partially completed, and it was released early June. Confusing many fans, Steve Rowe has reportedly called the new musical direction "easy-listening thrash". Rowe noted in a message for The Metal Resource about the reception of The Evil Addiction Destroying Machine: "With all new Mort releases there have been mixed response; pretty black and white. Some Really Like It and some really Don't Like It. But I knew with presenting the band in a reinvented way it was an excitingly dangerous move!"

In 2016, Rowe spoke in an interview about a re-pressing of Post Momentary Affliction on vinyl. He stated that former drummer Jayson Sherlock redesigned the artwork. On 1 January 2018, Rowe announced that he had reunited with Mick Jelinic and that they were jamming some of their old material, with possible new material to be written. The Intense Years: 30th Anniversary Box Set was released on Soundmass Records in 2020 and contained reissues of Mortification's first five studio albums and Live Planetarium, with each of them having extra material. An exclusive disc, Live 1996, is included with the box set.

Reception and legacy 
Mortification was described by Australian rock music historian, Ian McFarlane in his Encyclopedia of Australian Rock and Pop in 1999: "During the early 1990s, Mortification became internationally known as Australia's foremost Christian-inspired death metal band. Christian death metal: surely a contradiction in terms; but only for the uninitiated. Mortification successfully infused the down-tuned, sledgehammer riffs and gruff vocal style usually associated with the death/thrash metal genre with positive and spiritually uplifting lyric themes."

Records released after Steve Rowe's leukaemia have received poor reviews from critics, though they kept selling well. A critic wrote that "The weakest link of current Mortification are the lyrics. They are just somewhat naive and cheesy. On the old albums sinners screamed in pain in the fiery pits of hell, Satan was slaughtered; the rhetorics fit the spirit of the brutal music better. Apparently the fatherhood and going through the disease has calmed Rowe down too much, although on the early records the previous members Jayson Sherlock and Mick Carlisle wrote a lot of the lyrics." The different singing style Rowe did for many years after Post Momentary Affliction was another target for criticism, being called "poor screaming".

According to Australian writers Gary Garson and Peter Schultz, Mortification is the world's most successful Christian extreme metal band. Their first three albums are respected efforts of death metal. Blood World was a commercial hit and EnVision EvAngelene gained some respect for its music. During the tour for Blood World they played with Napalm Death, Sick of It All and Entombed for audiences consisting of thousands of people, and sold more merchandise than the other bands in the venues.

In Raised by Wolves, author John J. Thompson pointed out that upon forming Mortification, Rowe "suddenly had one of the most credible Christian death metal bands in the world on his hands." Thompson defined Mortification as "one of the heaviest bands ever to hit the Christian scene" and described its albums as "a blatantly evangelistic work of shredding death metal."

Discussing the social aspects of the extreme metal scene, author Keith Kahn-Harris wrote that overt Christian bands like Mortification are often "strongly criticized if their commitment to music is perceived to be subordinate to their commitment to politics." Kahn-Harris observed that "with a very few exceptions, overt Christian bands tend to be confined to their own, largely autonomous scenes." But he acknowledges that "music and scene can never be detached from flows of power and capital and hence a non-political scene is an impossibility. [...] The scene is enmeshed in relations of power and capital, despite its relative autonomy as a field."

Band members 

Current members
 Steve Rowe – vocals, bass (1990–present)
 Lincoln Bowen – rhythm and lead guitars, backing vocals (1996–2001, 2011–present)
 Andrew Esnouf – drums (2011–present)
 Michael Jelinic – Lead Guitars, Rhythm Guitars (2002–2011, 2018-present)

Former members
Cameron Hall – rhythm guitars (1990)
Jayson Sherlock – drums, backing vocals (1990–1993)
Michael Carlisle – lead guitars, backing vocals (1991–1994)
Phil Curlis–Gibson – drums (1993–1994)
George Ochoa – rhythm guitars, keyboards (1994–1996)
Keith Bannister – drums, backing vocals (1996–1999)
Adam Zaffarese – drums (2000–2003, 2008–2011)
Jeff Lewis – rhythm guitars (2002)
Mike Forsberg – drums (2003–2005)
Damien Percy – drums (2005–2008) (died 2018)
Dave Kilgallon – drums (2008)
Troy Dixon – guitars (2011)
Jason Campbell – rhythm guitars, vocals (1995)
Dave Kellogg – lead guitars (1995)
Josh Rivero – guitar (1995)
Bill Rice – drums (1995)

Touring musicians
Johnny Vasquez – drums  (1993)

Session musicians
Derek Sean – lead guitars (1991)

Timeline

Discography 

Studio albums
Mortification (1991)
Scrolls of the Megilloth (1992)
Post Momentary Affliction (1993)
Blood World (1994)
Primitive Rhythm Machine (1995)
EnVision EvAngelene (1996)
Triumph of Mercy (1998)
Hammer of God (1999)
The Silver Cord is Severed (2001)
Relentless (2002)
Brain Cleaner (2004)
Erasing the Goblin (2006)
The Evil Addiction Destroying Machine (2009)
Realm of the Skelataur (2015)

Demo albums
Break the Curse (1990)

EPs
 Scribe of the Pentateuch (2012)
 Ancient Prophecy/Overseer (2017)

Live albums
Live Planetarium (1993)
Live Without Fear (1996)
Noah Sat Down and Listened to the Mortification Live E.P. While Having a Coffee (1996, EP)
10 Years Live Not Dead (2000)
Live Humanitarian (2006)
Live 1996 (2020)

Compilation albums
The Best of Five Years (1996)
Ten Years 1990–2000 Power, Pain, and Passion (2002)
Twenty Years in the Underground (2010)

Box sets
The Intense Years: 30th Anniversary Box Set (2020)

Bootlegs
Australia Live (1992)
Distarnished Priest (1995)
Live Planetarium 2 (1995)
Triumph of Mercy (1998)
Conquer The Stump (2003)
Total Thrashing Death (2004)

Other appearances
Death Is Just The Beginning Vol. 2  1993
Scrolls of the Megilloth – Mortification (previously unreleased)Nuclear Blast Presents! Summer Blast 1994Hot Metal V: Screaming TruthTrack 7- An interview with Mortification
Track 8- Distarnish PriestGodspeed: Australian Metal Compilation- Time Crusaders (Studio Demo Version)Tourniquet/Mortification collector's edition CD singleTrack 9- Your Life
Track 10- J.G.S.H.
Track 11- Love Song
Track 12- A Short Interview with Steve Rowe on the History of Mortification

VideosMetal Missionaries (1991, video)Grind Planets (1993, video, 55 minutes)The History of Mortification (1994, video)Live Planetarium (1994, video, 60 minutes)EnVidion (1996, video, 60 minutes)Conquer The World (2002, DVD, 95 minutes)Grind Planets Reissue (2005, DVD, 89 minutes)Live Planetarium'' (2006, DVD, 90 minutes)

References 

General
  Note: Archived [on-line] copy has limited functionality.

Specific

External links 

 Official website

Australian death metal musical groups
Australian Christian metal musical groups
Musical groups established in 1987
Australian thrash metal musical groups
Musical groups from Melbourne
Christian extreme metal groups
Australian musical trios
Nuclear Blast artists
Rowe Productions artists